PREN may refer to:
Pitting resistance equivalent number, a measurement of the corrosion resistance of stainless steel containing nickel
Partido RENovador (Spanish for Renewal Party),  a former Panamanian right liberal political party